The 1994 Boston Red Sox season was the 94th season in the franchise's Major League Baseball history. The season was cut short by the 1994–95 Major League Baseball strike, and there was no postseason. When the strike started on August 12, the Red Sox were in fourth place in the American League East with a record of 54 wins and 61 losses, 17 games behind the New York Yankees.

Offseason 
 December 7, 1993: Otis Nixon was signed as a free agent by the Red Sox.
 February 1, 1994: Damon Berryhill was signed as a free agent by the Red Sox.
 February 10, 1994: Sergio Valdez was signed as a free agent by the Red Sox.
 March 29, 1994: Todd Frohwirth was signed as a free agent by the Red Sox.

Regular season 

On July 8, shortstop John Valentin executed an unassisted triple play in the sixth inning of a game against the Seattle Mariners—Valentin caught a line drive, touched second base, and tagged the runner coming from first base. Alex Rodriguez made his major league debut in the same game, going hitless in three at bats.

Season standings 
This was the first season that the American League was structured with three divisions, with a realignment creating the AL Central. As a result, the AL East was reduced from seven teams to five. With three divisions, this was scheduled to be the first season with a wild card team advancing to the postseason. However, due to a players' strike, the season ended in August, and there was no postseason.

Wild Card standings

Record vs. opponents

Notable transactions 
 April 9, 1994: Mario Díaz was signed as a free agent by the Red Sox.
 May 25, 1994: Mario Díaz was released by the Red Sox.
 May 31, 1994: Billy Hatcher and Paul Quantrill were traded by the Red Sox to the Philadelphia Phillies for Wes Chamberlain and Mike Sullivan.
 June 2, 1994: Nomar Garciaparra was drafted by the Red Sox in the 1st round (12th pick) of the 1994 MLB draft. Player signed July 20, 1994.
 June 2, 1994: Donnie Sadler was drafted by the Red Sox in the 11th round of the 1994 MLB draft. Player signed June 8, 1994.
 June 27, 1994: Greg A. Harris was released by the Red Sox.

Opening Day lineup 

Source:

Roster

Player stats

Batting

Starters by position 
Note: Pos = Position; G = Games played; AB = At bats; H = Hits; Avg. = Batting average; HR = Home runs; RBI = Runs batted in

Other batters 
Note: G = Games played; AB = At bats; H = Hits; Avg. = Batting average; HR = Home runs; RBI = Runs batted in

Pitching

Starting pitchers 
Note: G = Games pitched; IP = Innings pitched; W = Wins; L = Losses; ERA = Earned run average; SO = Strikeouts

Primary relief pitchers 
Note: G = Games pitched; W = Wins; L = Losses; SV = Saves; ERA = Earned run average; SO = Strikeouts

Spot starters and secondary relief pitchers 
Note: G = Games pitched; IP = Innings pitched; W = Wins; L = Losses; ERA = Earned run average; SO = Strikeouts

Farm system 

The Sarasota Red Sox replaced the Fort Lauderdale Red Sox as a Class A-Advanced affiliate.

Source:

Game log 

|- style="text-align:center; background-color:#bfb;"
| 1 || April 4 || Tigers  || 9–8 || Bankhead (1–0) || Davis (0–1) || Russell (1) || Fenway Park || 34,023 || 1–0 || W1
|- style="text-align:center; background-color:#bfb;"
| 2 || April 6 || Tigers  || 5–4 || Trlicek (1–0) || Wells (0–1) || Russell (2) || Fenway Park || 17,977  || 2–0 || W2
|- style="text-align:center; background-color:#bfb;"
| 3 || April 7 || Tigers  || 9–6 || Darwin (1–0)  || Belcher (0–1) || Harris (1) || Fenway Park || 15,304 || 3–0 || W3
|- style="text-align:center; background-color:#bfb;"
| 4 || April 8 || @ White Sox  || 8–6 || Fossas (1–0)  || Assenmacher (0–1)  || Russell (3) || Comiskey Park || 42,890 || 4–0 || W4
|- style="text-align:center; background-color:#fbb;"
| 5 || April 9 || @ White Sox  || 5–6 || McDowell (1–1)  || Harris (0–1)  || Hernandez (1) || Comiskey Park || 27,429 || 4–1 || L1
|- style="text-align:center; background-color:#fbb;"
| 6 || April 10 || @ White Sox  || 0–8 || Fernandez (1–1)  || Hesketh (0–1)  || — || Comiskey Park || 23,848 || 4–2 || L2
|- style="text-align:center; background-color:#bfb;"
| 7 || April 11 || @ Royals  || 8–5(10) || Quantrill (1–0)  || Magnante (0–1)  || — || Kauffman Stadium || 15,883 || 5–2 || W1
|- style="text-align:center; background-color:#bfb;"
| 8 || April 12 || @ Royals  || 22–11 || Darwin (2–0)  || Appier (0–2)  || — || Kauffman Stadium || 13,968 || 6–2 || W2
|- style="text-align:center; background-color:#fbb;"
| 9 || April 13 || @ Royals  || 1–2 || Brewer (1–0)  || Russell (0–1)  || — || Kauffman Stadium || 15,845 || 6–3 || L1
|- style="text-align:center; background-color:#bfb;"
| 10 || April 15 || White Sox  || 5–3 || Clemens (1–0)  || Fernandez (1–2)  || Russell (4) || Fenway Park || 31,085 || 7–3 || W1
|- style="text-align:center; background-color:#fbb;"
| 11 || April 17 || White Sox  || 4–7 || Sanderson (1–0)  || Viola (0–1)  || Hernandez (2) || Fenway Park || 34,501 || 7–4 || L1
|- style="text-align:center; background-color:#fbb;"
| 12 || April 18 || White Sox  || 1–12 || Álvarez (3–0)  || Darwin (2–1)  || — || Fenway Park || 34,657 || 7–5 || L2
|- style="text-align:center; background-color:#bfb;"
| 13 || April 19 || Athletics  || 13–5 || Sele (1–0)  || Welch (0–1)  || — || Fenway Park || 21,745 || 8–5 || W1
|- style="text-align:center; background-color:#bfb;"
| 14 || April 20 || Athletics  || 2–0 || Clemens (2–0)  || Karsay (0–1)  || — || Fenway Park || 25,372 || 9–5 || W2
|- style="text-align:center; background-color:#bfb;"
| 15 || April 21 || Athletics  || 6–5 || Bankhead (2–0)  || Eckersley (0–2)  || — || Fenway Park || 28,032 || 10–5 || W3
|- style="text-align:center; background-color:#bfb;"
| 16 || April 22 || Angels  || 6–5 || Harris (1–1)  || Sampen (0–1)  || — || Fenway Park || 25,870 || 11–5 || W4
|- style="text-align:center; background-color:#bfb;"
| 17 || April 23 || Angels  || 5–3 || Darwin (3–1)  || Dopson (1–2)  || Russell (5) || Fenway Park || 33,889 || 12–5 || W5
|- style="text-align:center; background-color:#bfb;"
| 18 || April 24 || Angels  || 5–4 || Sele (2–0)  || Leftwich (0–3)  || Russell (6) || Fenway Park || 32,521 || 13–5 || W6
|- style="text-align:center; background-color:#fbb;"
| 19 || April 25 || @ Mariners  || 2–4 || Johnson (2–1)  || Clemens (2–1)  || — || Kingdome || 35,468 || 13–6 || L1
|- style="text-align:center; background-color:#fbb;"
| 20 || April 26 || @ Mariners  || 3–4(10) || Ayala (2–1)  || Harris (1–2)  || — || Kingdome || 14,093 || 13–7 || L2
|- style="text-align:center; background-color:#bfb;"
| 21 || April 27 || @ Athletics  || 1–0 || Viola (1–1)  || Darling (2–2)  || Russell (7) || Oakland–Alameda County Coliseum || 15,250 || 14–7 || W1
|- style="text-align:center; background-color:#bfb;"
| 22 || April 28 || @ Athletics  || 4–1 || Darwin (4–1)  || Van Poppel (0–3)  || Russell (8) || Oakland–Alameda County Coliseum || 17,142 || 15–7 || W2
|- style="text-align:center; background-color:#bfb;"
| 23 || April 29 || @ Angels  || 6–4 || Sele (3–0)  || Leftwich (0–4)  || Ryan (1) || Anaheim Stadium || 30,178 || 16–7 || W3
|- style="text-align:center; background-color:#bfb;"
| 24 || April 30 || @ Angels  || 4–1 || Clemens (3–1)  || Leiter (2–2)  || Harris (2) || Anaheim Stadium || 55,057 || 17–7 || W4
|-

|- style="text-align:center; background-color:#bfb"
| 25 || May 1 || @ Angels || 10–1 || Hesketh (1–1) || Anderson (3–1) || — || Anaheim Stadium || 34,810 || 18–7 || W5
|- style="text-align:center; background-color:#bfb"
| 26 || May 3 || Mariners || 7–6 || Bankhead (3–0) || Fleming (2–4) || Ryan (2) || Fenway Park || 23,309 || 19–7 || W6
|- style="text-align:center; background-color:#bfb;"
| 27 || May 4 || Mariners || 4–2 || Darwin (5–1) || Hibbard (1–2) || Frohwirth (1) || Fenway Park || 24,807 || 20–7 || W7
|- style="text-align:center; background-color:#fbb;"
| 28 || May 6 || @ Yankees || 1–3 || Key (5–1) || Sele (3–1) || — || Yankee Stadium || 30,970 || 20–8 || L1
|- style="text-align:center; background-color:#fbb;"
| 29 || May 7 || @ Yankees || 5–6 || Wickman (1–0) || Russell (0–2) || — || Yankee Stadium || 44,712 || 20–9 || L2
|- style="text-align:center; background-color:#fbb;"
| 30 || May 8 || @ Yankees || 4–8 || Mulholland (4–2) || Quantrill (1–1) || Hitchcock (1) || Yankee Stadium || 28,680 || 20–10 || W3
|- style="text-align:center; background-color:#fbb;"
| 31 || May 9 || Brewers || 4–7 || Ignasiak (1–0) || Darwin (5–2) || — || Fenway Park || 21,844 || 20–11 || L4
|- style="text-align:center; background-color:#fbb;"
| 32 || May 10 || Brewers || 5–9 || Navarro (2–2) || Harris (1–3) || — || Fenway Park || 20,473 || 20–12 || L5
|- style="text-align:center; background-color:#bfb;"
| 33 || May 11 || Brewers || 7–1 || Sele (4–1) || Eldred (3–4) || — || Fenway Park || 21,471 || 21–12 || W1
|- style="text-align:center; background-color:#bfb;"
| 34 || May 12 || Brewers || 3–1 || Clemens (4–1) || Bones (3–2) || Russell (9) || Fenway Park || 22,126 || 22–12 || W2
|- style="text-align:center; background-color:#bfb;"
| 35 || May 13 || Blue Jays || 5–3 || Hesketh (2–1) || Hentgen (5–3) || Ryan (3) || Fenway Park || 32,579 || 23–12 || W3
|- style="text-align:center; background-color:#bfb;"
| 36 || May 14 || Blue Jays || 11–2 || Darwin (6–2) || Leiter (2–3) || — || Fenway Park || 33,771 || 24–12 || W4
|- style="text-align:center; background-color:#fbb"
| 37 || May 17 || @ Orioles || 2–3 || Mussina (7–1) || Clemens (4–2) || Smith (16) || Oriole Park at Camden Yards || 47,420 || 24–13 || L1
|- style="text-align:center; background-color:#bfb"
| 38 || May 18 || @ Orioles || 5–2 || Sele (5–1) || McDonald (7–2) || — || Oriole Park at Camden Yards || 47,612 || 25–13 || W1
|- style="text-align:center; background-color:#bfb"
| 39 || May 19 || @ Orioles || 3–2 || Darwin (7–2) || Fernandez (2–2) || Russell (10) || Oriole Park at Camden Yards || 47,467 || 26–13 || W2
|- style="text-align:center; background-color:#fbb"
| 40 || May 20 || @ Twins || 2–21 || Pulido (2–3) || Hesketh (2–2) || — || Metrodome || 20,766 || 26–14 || L1
|- style="text-align:center; background-color:#fbb"
| 41 || May 21 || @ Twins || 0–1 || Tapani (4–2) || Finnvold (0–1) || Aguilera (9) || Metrodome || 28,457 || 26–15 || L2
|- style="text-align:center; background-color:#bfb"
| 42 || May 22 || @ Twins || 9–2 || Clemens (5–2) || Deshaies (2–5) || — || Metrodome || 21,971 || 27–15 || W1
|- style="text-align:center; background-color:#fbb"
| 43 || May 24 || Indians || 3–5 || Morris (3–4) || Sele (5–2) || Shuey (1) || Fenway Park || 29,696 || 27–16 || L1
|- style="text-align:center; background-color:#bfb;"
| 44 || May 26 || Indians || 13–5 || Hesketh (3–2) || Tavárez (0–1) || — || Fenway Park || 28,380 || 28–16 || W1
|- style="text-align:center; background-color:#fbb;"
| 45 || May 27 || @ Rangers || 3–4 || Fajardo (1–0) || Frohwirth (0–1) || Carpenter (3) || The Ballpark at Arlington || 43,761 || 28–17 || L1
|- style="text-align:center; background-color:#bfb;"
| 46 || May 28 || @ Rangers || 3–2 (10)|| Harris (2–3) || Carpenter (2–2) || Russell (11) || The Ballpark at Arlington || 46,396 || 29–17 || W1
|- style="text-align:center; background-color:#fbb"
| 47 || May 29 || @ Rangers || 6–8 || Rogers (6–3) || Darwin (7–2) || — || The Ballpark at Arlington || 46,354 || 29–18 || L1
|- style="text-align:center; background-color:#bfb"
| 48 || May 30 || Royals || 6–5 (10)|| Ryan (1–0) || Pichardo (0–2) || — || Fenway Park || 33,341 || 30–18 || W1
|- style="text-align:center; background-color:#fbb"
| 49 || May 31 || Royals || 7–9 || Gordon (5–3) || Hesketh (3–3) || Meacham (1) || Fenway Park || 22,537 || 30–19 || L1 
|-

|- style="text-align:center; background-color:#bfb;"
| 50 || June 1 || Royals || 4–2 || Fossas (2–0) || Magnante (1–2) || Russell (12) || Fenway Park || 28,307 || 31–19 || W1
|- style="text-align:center; background-color:#fbb;"
| 51 || June 3 || Rangers || 2–13 || Hurst (1–1) || Finnvold (0–2) || — || Fenway Park || 33,524 || 31–20 || L1
|- style="text-align:center; background-color:#fbb;"
| 52 || June 4 || Rangers || 4–10 || Rogers (7–3) || Darwin (7–4) || — || Fenway Park || 32,325 || 31–21 || L2
|- style="text-align:center; background-color:#fbb"
| 53 || June 5 || Rangers || 7–10 || Howell (3–1) || Russell (0–3) || — || Fenway Park || 33,803 || 31–22 || L3
|- style="text-align:center; background-color:#fbb"
| 54 || June 6 || @ Tigers || 5–11 || Belcher (4–8) || Hesketh (3–4) || — || Tiger Stadium || 19,570 || 31–23 || L4
|- style="text-align:center; background-color:#bfb"
| 55 || June 7 || @ Tigers || 5–1 || Clemens (6–2) || Wells (1–3) || — || Tiger Stadium || 13,708 || 32–23 || W1
|- style="text-align:center; background-color:#fbb"
| 56 || June 8 || @ Tigers || 5–14 || Gullickson (4–4) || Finnvold (0–3) || — || Tiger Stadium || 17,414 || 32–24 || L1
|- style="text-align:center; background-color:#fbb"
| 57 || June 10 || Orioles || 7–10 || Oquist (2–1) || Ryan (1–1) || Smith (24) || Fenway Park || 33,673 || 32–25 || L2
|- style="text-align:center; background-color:#fbb"
| 58 || June 11 || Orioles || 2–5 || Mussina (9–3) || Sele (5–3) || Mills (2) || Fenway Park || 33,295 || 32–26 || L3
|- style="text-align:center; background-color:#fbb;"
| 59 || June 12 || Orioles || 4–8 || McDonald (9–4) || Minchey (0–1) || — || Fenway Park || 32,280 || 32–27 || L4
|- style="text-align:center; background-color:#fbb;"
| 60 || June 13 || Twins || 2–5 || Deshaies (3–6) || Clemens (6–3) || Aguilera (13) || Fenway Park || 29,159 || 32–28 || L5
|- style="text-align:center; background-color:#fbb;"
| 61 || June 14 || Twins || 4–5 || Stevens (2–1) || Finnvold (0–4) || Aguilera (14) || Fenway Park || 27,874 || 32–29 || L6
|- style="text-align:center; background-color:#fbb;"
| 62 || June 15 || Twins || 5–7 || Erickson (6–5) || Darwin (7–5) || Aguilera (15) || Fenway Park || 30,243 || 32–30 || L7
|- style="text-align:center; background-color:#fbb;"
| 63 || June 16 || @ Indians || 6–7 || Farr (1–1) || Russell (0–4) || — || Jacobs Field || 41,631 || 32–31 || L8
|- style="text-align:center; background-color:#fbb;"
| 64 || June 17 || @ Indians || 1–8 || Martínez (5–4) || Minchey  (0–2) || — || Jacobs Field || 41,189 || 32–32 || L9
|- style="text-align:center; background-color:#fbb;"
| 65 || June 18 || @ Indians || 2–8 || Plunk (5–2) || Clemens (6–4) || — || Jacobs Field || 41,759 || 32–33 || L10
|- style="text-align:center; background-color:#fbb;"
| 66 || June 19 || @ Indians || 5–6 || Morris (6–4) || Harris (2–4) || Shuey (5) || Jacobs Field || 41,833 || 32–34 || L11
|- style="text-align:center; background-color:#bfb;"
| 67 || June 20 || @ Blue Jays || 4–1 || Hesketh (4–4) || Stottlemyre (5–4) || Fossas (1) || SkyDome || 50,028 || 33–34 || W1
|- style="text-align:center; background-color:#bfb;"
| 68 || June 21 || @ Blue Jays || 13–1 || Sele (6–3) || Cornett (0–2) || — || SkyDome || 49,460 || 34–34 || W2
|- style="text-align:center; background-color:#bfb"
| 69 || June 22 || @ Blue Jays || 3–2 || Minchey (1–2) || Stewart (5–6) || Ryan (4) || SkyDome || 50,288 || 35–34 || W3
|- style="text-align:center; background-color:#bfb"
| 70 || June 24 || @ Brewers || 4–3 || Harris (3–4) || Fetters (1–4) || Ryan (5) || Milwaukee County Stadium || 18,914 || 36–34 || W4
|- style="text-align:center; background-color:#bfb"
| 71 || June 25 || @ Brewers || 10–8 (12)|| Ryan (2–1) || Henry (2–3) || — || Milwaukee County Stadium || 35,234 || 37–34 || W5
|- style="text-align:center; background-color:#fbb"
| 72 || June 26 || @ Brewers || 4–5 || Navarro (3–6) || Van Egmond (0–1) || Fetters (2) || Milwaukee County Stadium || 29,414 || 37–35 || L1
|- style="text-align:center; background-color:#fbb"
| 73 || June 27 || Yankees || 1–5 || Key (12–1) || Sele (6–4) || — || Fenway Park || 33,204 || 37–36 || L2
|- style="text-align:center; background-color:#fbb"
| 74 || June 28 || Yankees || 4–10 || Pérez (6–3) || Minchey (1–3) || — || Fenway Park || 33,268 || 37–37 || L3
|- style="text-align:center; background-color:#fbb;"
| 75 || June 29 || Yankees || 3–4 (10) || Howe (1–0) || Russell (0–5) || — || Fenway Park || 32,704 || 37–38 || L4
|- style="text-align:center; background-color:#bfb;"
| 76 || June 30 || Yankees || 6–5 || Howard (1–0) || Wickman (3–3) || Ryan (6)|| Fenway Park || 32,967 || 38–38 || W1
|-

|- style="text-align:center; background-color:#fbb;"
| 77 || July 1 || Athletics || 3–6 || Darling (6–9) || Van Egmond (0–2) || — || Fenway Park || 28,336 || 38–39 || L1
|- style="text-align:center; background-color:#bfb"
| 78 || July 2 || Athletics || 10–2 || Sele (7–4) || Van Poppel (4–7) || — || Fenway Park || 31,792 || 39–39 || W1
|- style="text-align:center; background-color:#fbb"
| 79 || July 3 || Athletics  || 0–10 || Witt (7–7) || Nabholz (0–2) || — || Fenway Park || 30,943 || 39–40 || L1
|- style="text-align:center; background-color:#bfb"
| 80 || July 4 || Angels  || 4–1 || Clemens (7–4) || Leftwich (3–7) || — || Fenway Park || 26,624 || 40–40 || W1
|- style="text-align:center; background-color:#fbb;"
| 81 || July 5 || Angels || 3–10 || Finley (6–8) || Hesketh (4–5) || — || Fenway Park || 26,199 || 40–41 || L1
|- style="text-align:center; background-color:#fbb;"
| 82 || July 6 || Angels || 6–10 || Patterson (2–3) || Bailey (0–1) || — || Fenway Park || 28,763 || 40–42 || L2
|- style="text-align:center; background-color:#fbb;"
| 83 || July 7 || Mariners || 3–4 (10)|| Johnson (10–4) || Ryan (2–2) || Ayala (12) || Fenway Park || 33,249 || 40–43 || L3
|- style="text-align:center; background-color:#bfb"
| 84 || July 8 || Mariners || 4–3 || Nabholz (1–2) || Risley (6–5) || Ryan (7)|| Fenway Park || 33,355 || 41–43 || W1
|- style="text-align:center; background-color:#fbb"
| 85 || July 9 || Mariners || 4–7 || Bosio (4–10) || Valdez (0–1) || Ayala (13) || Fenway Park || 33,092 || 41–44 || L1 
|- style="text-align:center; background-color:#bfb"
| 86 || July 10 || Mariners || 9–2 || Hesketh (5–5) || Converse (0–2) || — || Fenway Park || 33,555 || 42–44 || W1
|- style="text-align:center; background-color:#bfb"
| 87 || July 14 || @ Athletics || 2–1 || Clemens (8–4) || Van Poppel (5–8) || — || Oakland-Alameda County Coliseum || 40,457 || 43–44 || W2
|- style="text-align:center; background-color:#bfb"
| 88 || July 15 || @ Athletics || 4–1 || Nabholz (2–2) || Eckersley (2–4) || Ryan (8) || Oakland-Alameda County Coliseum || 23,607 || 44–44 || W3
|- style="text-align:center; background-color:#fbb"
| 89 || July 16 || @ Athletics || 0–9 || Darling (9–9) || Sele (7–5) || — || Oakland-Alameda County Coliseum || 26,540 || 44–45 || L1
|- style="text-align:center; background-color:#bfb
| 90 || July 17 || @ Athletics || 4–3 || Farr (2–1) || Acre (4–1) || Ryan (9) || Oakland-Alameda County Coliseum || 31,480 || 45–45 || W1
|- style="text-align:center; background-color:#fbb;"
| 91 || July 18 || @ Angels || 4–13 || Anderson (6–4) || Van Egmond (0–3) || — || Anaheim Stadium || 17,019 || 45–46 || L1
|- style="text-align:center; background-color:#fbb;"
| 92 || July 19 || @ Angels || 4–6 || Langston (6–6) || Clemens (8–5) || Grahe (13) || Anaheim Stadium || 20,335 || 45–47 || L2
|- style="text-align:center; background-color:#fbb;"
| 93 || July 20 || @ Angels || 4–8 || Leftwich (5–8) || Nabholz (2–3) || Springer (1) || Anaheim Stadium || 17,180 || 45–48 || L3
|- style="text-align:center; background-color:#fbb;"
| 94 || July 22 || Mariners || 3–6 || Johnson (11–5) || Sele (7–6) || Ayala (15) || Fenway Park || 11,776 || 45–49 || L4
|- style="text-align:center; background-color:#bfb;"
| 95 || July 23 (1) || Mariners || 6–5 || Hesketh (6–5) || Fleming (6–11) || Ryan (10) || Fenway Park || — || 46–49 || W1
|- style="text-align:center; background-color:#fbb"
| 96 || July 23 (2)|| Mariners || 3–6 (11)|| Ayala (4–2) || Meléndez (0–1) || — || Fenway Park || 17,168 || 46–50 || L1
|- style="text-align:center; background-color:#bfb"
| 97 || July 24 || Mariners || 8–2 || Clemens (9–5) || Glinatsis (0–1) || — || Fenway Park || 22,411 || 47–50 || W1
|- style="text-align:center; background-color:#bfb"
| 98 || July 26 || @ Yankees || 10–7 || Nabholz (3–3) || Key (15–3) || — || Yankee Stadium || 38,448 || 48–50 || W2
|- style="text-align:center; background-color:#fbb"
| 99 || July 27 || @ Yankees || 3–4 (11)|| Wickman (5–3) || Ryan (2–3) || — || Yankee Stadium || 42,482 || 48–51 || L1
|- style="text-align:center; background-color:#bfb"
| 100 || July 28 || @ Yankees || 1–0 || Hesketh (7–5) || Kamieniecki (7–6) || Ryan (11) || Yankee Stadium || 44,403 || 49–51 || W1
|- style="text-align:center; background-color:#bfb"
| 101 || July 29 || Brewers || 7–2 || Van Egmond (1–3) || Miranda (1–4) || — || Fenway Park || 33,528 || 50–51 || W2
|- style="text-align:center; background-color:#fbb"
| 102 || July 30 || Brewers || 1–5 || Eldred (10–10) || Clemens (9–6) || Fetters (15) || Fenway Park || 33,081 || 50–52 || L1
|- style="text-align:center; background-color:#fbb"
| 103 || July 31 || Brewers || 2–5 || Navarro (4–7) || Nabholz (3–4) || Fetters (16) || Fenway Park || 32,220 || 50–53 || L2
|-

|- style="text-align:center; background-color:#fbb"
| 104 || August 1 (1)|| Blue Jays || 2–6 || Hentgen (13–7) || Sele (7–7) || — || Fenway Park || — || 50–54 || L3
|- style="text-align:center; background-color:#bfb"
| 105 || August 1 (2)|| Blue Jays || 4–3 || Minchey (2–3) || Cornett (1–3) || Ryan (12) || Fenway Park || 33,429 || 51–54 || W1
|- style="text-align:center; background-color:#fbb"
| 106 || August 2 || Blue Jays || 6–7 || Cox (1–1) || Bankhead (3–1) || Hall (15) || Fenway Park || 32,976 || 51–55 || L1
|- style="text-align:center; background-color:#bfb"
| 107 || August 3 || Blue Jays || 7–2 || Van Egmond (2–3) || Leiter (6–6) || — || Fenway Park || 32,047 || 52–55 || W1
|- style="text-align:center; background-color:#fbb;"
| 108 || August 4 || Blue Jays || 2–5 || Stottlemyre (6–7) || Clemens (9–7) || Hall (16) || Fenway Park || 33,199 || 52–56 || L1
|- style="text-align:center; background-color:#bfb;"
| 109 || August 6 (1) || Indians || 8–4 || Sele (8–7) || Grimsley (4–2) || Howard (1) || Fenway Park || 24,934 || 53–56 || W1
|- style="text-align:center; background-color:#fbb;"
| 110 || August 6 (2) || Indians || 0–7 || Martínez (11–6) || Nabholz (3–5) || — || Fenway Park || 32,405 || 53–57 || L1
|- style="text-align:center; background-color:#bfb;"
| 111 || August 7 (1) || Indians || 4–1 || Hesketh (8–5) || Ogea (0–1) || Ryan (13) || Fenway Park || — || 54–57 || W1
|- style="text-align:center; background-color:#fbb;"
| 112 || August 7 (2) || Indians || 10–15 (12)|| Russell (1–6) || Frohwirth (0–2) || — || Fenway Park || 34,523 || 54–58 || L1
|- style="text-align:center; background-color:#fbb;"
| 113 || August 8 || @ Twins || 2–5 || Tapani (11–7) || Trilicek (1–1) || Aguilera (23) || Metrodome || 22,733 || 54–59 || L2
|- style="text-align:center; background-color:#fbb;"
| 114 || August 9 || @ Twins || 3–4 (12)|| Stevens (5–2) || Frohwirth (0–3) || — || Metrodome || 21,429 || 54–60 || L3
|- style="text-align:center; background-color:#fbb;"
| 115 || August 10 || @ Twins || 7–17 || Deshaies (6–12) || Bankhead (3–2) || — || Metrodome || 23,492 || 54–61 || L4
|-

|Reference:

Awards and honors 
 Andre Dawson, Hutch Award

All-Star Game
 Scott Cooper, reserve 3B

References

External links
 1994 Boston Red Sox team page at Baseball Reference
 1994 Boston Red Sox season at baseball-almanac.com

Boston Red Sox seasons
Boston Red Sox
Boston Red Sox
Red Sox